Mission Majnu is an 2023 Indian Hindi-language spy thriller film directed by Shantanu Bagchi and produced by Ronnie Screwvala, Amar Butala and Garima Mehta. Starring Sidharth Malhotra, the film takes place before and during the Indo-Pakistani War of 1971. Rashmika Mandanna, Parmeet Sethi, Sharib Hashmi, Kumud Mishra, and Rajit Kapur play supporting roles.

The film faced multiple delays, first being scheduled for theatrical release on 13 May 2022 and then on 10 June the same year before being indefinitely delayed. Ultimately, the film's theatrical release was cancelled and it was released directly on Netflix on 20 January 2023

Plot 
Amandeep Singh, IPS, is a deep cover RAW field operative in Pakistan on undercover mission. Along the way he got married to Nasreen Hussain. On May 1974, India conduct its first Nuclear test. Pakistan not wanting to fall behind, secretly rush to build their own nuclear weapon.

During 1977 Indian general election campaign, Prime Minister of India is appraised of the situation by RAW Chief, R.N. Kao, and direct him to find the location of the nuclear facility. Amandeep Singh is activated by Kao. Amandeep handler, Sharma, inform him of his new mission, named "Mission Majnu". Along the way, he meet Aslam Usmaniya and Raman Singh, two other RAW agents stationed in Pakistan. Amandeep manage to gather information that Pakistan indeed is making nuclear weapon. 

In India, following a general election, a new government is formed and its new leader believe in building relationship through diplomacy and peaceful means, and is against any form of warfare including spying and intelligence gathering. Kao resign to keep the operation in Pakistan going, and hidden from the Prime Minister. Amandeep operation take a hit, nonetheless he continue the mission. In the meantime relationship bode between India and Pakistan. Israel is readying an attack on Quetta military facility, wrongly believing it to be nuclear weapon facility. 

Amandeep manage to locate the nuclear facility at Kahuta, however he unable to collect physical evidence. Sharma inform them that Israel is going to attack Quetta in 48 hours. Amandeep goes back to Kahuta and collect hairs of Army personnel working in the nuclear facility, which he surreptitiously send it to India. In india, It is tested and found to contain trace amount of radiation, pointing to presence of plutonium in Kahuta, and under Pakistan administration. Israel attack on Quetta is averted.

The matter is disclosed to Prime Minister of India. In light of new evidence, India Prime Minister weighed in on Pakistan counterpart and Pakistan inability to be trusted. Pakistan ISI hunt down and kill covert RAW agents operating in Pakistan including Amandeep colleague Aslam and Raman. Amandeep tries to escape Pakistan via Dubai with his pregnant wife, unbeknownst to her of ISI agent chasing them, Amandeep distract ISI agents long enough to let his wife board an aeroplane and leave unhindered, in the process he is killed.

Kao meet Nasreen in Dubai Airport, and read a letter from her late husband revealing his true identity.

Cast 
 Sidharth Malhotra as Amandeep Ajitpal Singh IPS (Aman) / Tariq Hussain, a RAW agent
 Rashmika Mandanna as Nasreen Hussain/Nasreen Singh, Tariq’s wife/Aman, who is blind and pregnant 
 Parmeet Sethi as R.N. Kao
 Sharib Hashmi as Aslam Usmaniya, a RAW field agent
 Mir Sarwar as Abdul Qadeer Khan, a  Nuclear Scientist from Pakistan
 Kumud Mishra as Raman Singh / Maulvi Saab, Senior Field agent
 Ashwath Bhatt as General Muhammad Zia-ul-Haq
 Zakir Hussain as Sharma, RAW spy handler
 Rajit Kapur as Zulfikar Ali Bhutto, Prime Minister of Pakistan
 Avijit Dutt as Morarji Desai, Prime Minister of India
 Avantika Akerkar as Indira Gandhi, Prime Minister of India

Production 
The film was announced in December 2020. Principal photography began in February 2021 at Lucknow and  the film wrapped up in September 2021.

Soundtrack 

The score is composed by Ketan Sodha. The songs are composed by Tanishk Bagchi, Rochak Kohli, Raghav Sachar and Arko, and the lyrics are written by Manoj Muntashir, Shabbir Ahmed, Rohit Sharma and A. M. Turaz.

The first single titled "Rabba Janda" was released on 25 December 2022. The second single titled "Maati Ko Maa Kehte Hain" was released on 17 January 2023.

Reception 
Bollywood Hungama rated the film 3.5 out of 5 stars and termed the film as a "gripping saga" with a tight script, intelligent scenes, taut execution, and a memorable performance." Tushar Joshi for India Today rated 3 out of 5 stars and wrote, "Sidharth is good in scenes where he is battling the stigma and pain of his past yet wants to move ahead and show his loyalty to his country and team. Rashmika Mandanna doesn’t have much to do apart from trying to strike up some chemistry with Sid."  Dhaval Roy of The Times of India rated the film 3 out of 5 and wrote that the film is "gripping in parts, but it’s too convenient, which takes away from the narrative. While great, the action stretches in places and makes the movie seem formulaic". Dishya Sharma of News 18 rated the film 3 out of 5 stars and wrote "Mission Majnu robs you of the thrills of a spy film. Watch it to see Sidharth and Rashmika in a different avatars".

Anuj Kumar for The Hindu wrote "There are interesting twists in the way Tariq ekes out information and how Nasreen could sense the truth by touch, but the execution makes it a tad too cloying for a thriller. Thankfully, the film is not overtly jingoistic and makes a clear distinction in the way Indira Gandhi and Morarji Desai handled the tenuous relationship with Pakistan in the 1970s. At the same time, the writers place characters on both sides of the border who could see history beyond the divisive version that the politicians often present." Saibal Chatterjee of NDTV rated the movie only 2 stars out of 5 and wrote "Mission Majnu does not deliver a thrill a minute nor does it produce any exceptional degree of tension and suspense. Yet, parts of the film, especially in the second hour, do spring to life." Shilajit Mitra for The New Indian Express rated 2 out of 5 stars and wrote, "Mission Majnu isn’t as crudely jingoistic as something like Bhuj: The Pride of India.  The film also does not comment on the moral implications of nuclear proliferation; for that, you will have to see the pilot of Rocket Boys."

References

External links 
 

2020s spy films
Indian spy thriller films
2020s Hindi-language films
Indian action thriller films
2023 action thriller films